This is a list of Communications in Saint Kitts and Nevis.

Telephone 

Saint Kitts and Nevis is a member of the North American Numbering Plan (NANP), whose assigned area code is area code 869.

When dialing from a telephone in Saint Kitts and Nevis, telephone users can dial the local seven digit number. When calling a telephone number in the United States, Canada or any other NANP member country from Saint Kitts and Nevis, the user would dial 1 + area code + phone number.

When calling a telephone number inside Saint Kitts and Nevis from the United States, Canada or other countries participating in the NANP, the user would dial 1 + 869 + seven digit phone number.

Telephones - main lines in use: 17,000 (1997)

Telephones - mobile cellular: at least 30,000(2005)

Telephone system:

General assessment: good inter-island and international connections

Domestic: inter-island links to Antigua and Barbuda and Saint Martin (Guadeloupe and Netherlands Antilles) are handled by VHF/UHF/SHF radiotelephone

International: International calls are carried by radiotelephone to Antigua and Barbuda and switched there to submarine cable or to Intelsat; or carried to Saint Martin (Guadeloupe and Netherlands Antilles) by radiotelephone and switched to Intelsat.

Radio 

Radio broadcast stations: AM 3, FM 1, shortwave 0 (1998)
 550 ZIZ (Bird Rock)
 820
 860 VON - Voice of Nevis
 89.9 ZIZ (formerly 90.0)
 90.3 Sugar City Rock FM
 92.9 Gem Radio Network
 93.3 Gem Radio Network
 94.1 SKNBC Radio One
 95.9 ZIZ (formerly 96.0) (Nevis)
 96.1 ZIZ (formerly 96.0) (Basseterre)
 96.7 Big Wave Radio (Saint Kitts)
 96.9 ZIZ
 98.3 Vybz FM/Family FM
 98.9 Winn FM
 102.5 Kyss 102.5 FM - The Love Radio
 103.3 Goodwill Radio
 104.5 Goodwill Radio
 106.5 Freedom FM

Radios: 28,000 (1997)

Television 

Television broadcast stations: 1 (ZIZ-TV, plus three repeaters) (1997)

Televisions: 10,000 (1997)

Internet 

Country code: .kn (Top-level domain)

Internet Service Providers (ISPs): 16 (2000)

Internet users: 2,001 (2000)

Average Internet Speed: 27.84 mbps download/10.74 mbps upload (2020)

References

External links 
 
 Eastern Caribbean Telecommunications Authority (ECTEL)
 Saint Kitts and Nevis, SubmarineCableMap.com
 , WorldData.info

Saint Kitts and Nevis
 
Saint Kitts